Robert Stanley "Bob" Barton (February 13, 1925 – January 28, 2009) was the chief architect of the Burroughs B5000 and other computers such as the B1700, a co-inventor of dataflow architecture, and an influential professor at the University of Utah.

His students at Utah have had a large role in the development of computer science.

Barton designed machines at a more abstract level, not tied to the technology constraints of the time. He employed high-level languages and a stack machine in his design of the B5000 computer. Its design survives in the modern Unisys Burroughs MCP. His work with stack machine architectures was the first implementation in a mainframe computer.

Barton died on January 28, 2009, in Portland, Oregon, at age of 83.

Career 
Barton was born in New Britain, Connecticut in 1925 and received his BA in 1948, and his MS in 1949 in Mathematics, from the University of Iowa. His early experience with computers was when he worked in the IBM Applied Science Department in 1951.

In 1954, he joined the Shell Oil Company Technical Services, working on programming applications. He worked at Shell Development, a research group in Texas where he worked with a Burroughs/Datatron 205 computer. In 1958, he studied Irving Copi and Jan Łukasiewicz's work on symbolic logic and Polish notation, and considered its application to arithmetic expression processing on a computer.

Barton joined Burroughs Corporation, ElectroData Division, in Pasadena, California in the late 1950s. He managed a system programming group in 1959 which developed a compiler named BALGOL for the language ALGOL 58 on the Burroughs 220 computer.

In 1960, he became a consultant for Beckman Instruments working on data collection from satellite systems, for Lockheed Corporation working on satellite systems and organizing of data processing services, and for Burroughs continuing to work on the design concepts of the B5000.

After an assignment in Australia in 1963 for Control Data Corporation, he returned in 1965 to join the Computer Science staff of the Department of Electrical Engineering at the University of Utah where, from 1968 to 1973, his colleagues included David C. Evans, Ivan Sutherland, and Thomas Stockham. His Ph.D. students at the University of Utah were Duane Call, cofounder of Computer System Architects; Alan Ashton, cofounder of WordPerfect; and Al Davis, University of Utah professor of computer science. Other Utah students that he influenced included: Alan Kay, James H. Clark cofounder of Silicon Graphics, John Warnock, cofounder of Adobe Systems, Ed Catmull of Pixar, Henri Gouraud (Gouraud shading) and Bui Tuong Phong (Phong shading).

After 1973, he devoted his full-time to Burroughs Systems Research in La Jolla, San Diego, California, working on new computer architectures and systems programming.

Awards 
 IEEE 1977 W. Wallace McDowell Award Recipient. “For his innovative architectural computer concepts, such as stack processing, data stored with self-describing tags, and the direct execution of higher level languages, as embodied in the B-5000 and successor machines”
 Barton was the first recipient of the ACM/IEEE Computer Society Eckert–Mauchly Award in 1979: For his outstanding contributions in basing the design of computing systems on the hierarchical nature of programs and their data.
 Charter Computer Pioneer by the IEEE Computer Society for his work in Language Directed Architecture.

Selected papers

Quotes
"Systems programmers are the high priests of a low cult." (1967)

References
 "Robert S. Barton: IEEE 1977 W. Wallace McDowell Award Recipient"

Further reading 
 Waychoff, Richard, "Stories about the B5000 and people who were there", April 9, 1979

External links
 The Early History of Smalltalk by Alan C. Kay
 History of the School of Computing – University of Utah
 History of the College of Engineering – University of Utah (see pp. 52, 63)
 A Critical Review of the State of the Programming Art
  A New Approach to the Functional Design of a Digital Computer (Barton, 1961)

Computer hardware engineers
Burroughs Corporation people
1925 births
2009 deaths
University of Iowa alumni
University of Utah faculty
Unisys